Bella Bella is a 1976 studio album by Sten & Stanley.

Track listing

Charts

References 

1976 albums
Sten & Stanley albums